The 2021–22 All-Ireland Junior Club Hurling Championship was the 18th staging of the All-Ireland Junior Club Hurling Championship, the Gaelic Athletic Association's junior inter-county club hurling tournament. It will be the first club championship to be completed in two years as the 2020-21 series was cancelled due to the COVID-19 pandemic. The championship began on 14 November 2021 and ended on 5 February 2022.

The All-Ireland final was played on 5 February 2022 at Croke Park in Dublin, between Mooncoin from Kilkenny and Ballygiblin from Cork, in what was their first ever meeting in a final. Mooncoin won the match by 0-22 to 1-18 to claim their first ever championship title.

Mooncoin's Patrick Walsh was the championship's top scorer with 5-35.

Team summaries

Connacht Junior Club Hurling Championship

Connacht Junior Club Hurling Championship

Semi-final

Final

Leinster Junior Club Hurling Championship

Leinster Junior Club Hurling Championship

First round

Quarter-finals

Semi-finals

Final

Munster Junior Club Hurling Championship

Munster Junior Club Hurling Championship

Quarter-finals

Semi-finals

Final

Ulster Junior Club Hurling Championship

Ulster Junior Club Hurling Championship

Quarter-finals

Semi-finals

Final

All-Ireland Junior Club Hurling Championship

All-Ireland Junior Club Hurling Championship

Quarter-final

Semi-finals

Final

Championship statistics

Top scorers

Overall

In a single game

References

All-Ireland Junior Club Hurling Championship
All-Ireland Junior Club Hurling Championship
2017